The UiTM Shah Alam LRT station is a light rapid transit (LRT) station that serves the Universiti Teknologi MARA (UiTM) campus and Seksyen 16 areas in Shah Alam, Selangor, Malaysia. It serves as one of the stations on the Shah Alam line.  The station is an elevated rapid transit station forming part of the Klang Valley Integrated Transit System. The station is located between Petronas and Shell petrol stations near Federal Highway.

The station is marked as Station No. 14 along the RM9 billion line project with the line's maintenance depot located in Johan Setia, Klang. This LRT station is expected to be operational in February 2024 and will have facilities such as public parking, kiosks, restrooms, elevators, taxi stand and feeder bus among others.

Surrounding Areas
 UiTM Graduate Institute (IPSis, AAGSB)
 Dewan Tuanku Chanselor UiTM
 UiTM Residential colleges (Kenanga, Perindu, Cempaka)
 UiTM Faculties (Law, Engineering, Science, Business)
 Stadium UiTM
 Kompleks Perumahan Kerajaan Selangor Seksyen 16
 Flat PKNS Seksyen 16

References

External links
 LRT3 Bandar Utama–Klang line

Rapid transit stations in Selangor
Shah Alam Line
Universiti Teknologi MARA